Nathalia Goyannes Dill Orrico (born 24 March 1986) is a Brazilian actress. She has played the lead role in three telenovelas, the lead antagonist role in another two and the lead role in 2012's film Artificial Paradises.

Career 
Nathalia was born in the city of Rio de Janeiro. Dill played the antagonist role as Débora Rios in the telenovela Malhação from 2007 to 2009. She then played the lead role in the Rede Globo telenovela Paraíso, by Benedito Ruy Barbosa, where she played the role of Maria Rita (nicknamed Santinha). Nathalia Dill was cast to play the lead role in the telenovela Escrito nas Estrelas, in which she played the character Viviane. Her character, named Doralice, was part of the main love triangle of 2011 Rede Globo's telenovela Cordel Encantado. Nathalia Dill played one of the lead roles, Érica, in the 2011 film Paraísos Artificiais. She plays Débora in the 2012, telenovela Avenida Brasil, by João Emanuel Carneiro, her character falls in love to Jorge, played by Cauã Reymond. Nathalia Dill played the lead antagonist for the second time in her career in the 2013, Rede Globo telenovela Joia Rara, her character is named as Sílvia. She starred as the journalist Laura in the 2014 telenovela Alto Astral.

Filmography

Television

Cinema

Theater

Awards and nominations

References

External links 

1986 births
Living people
Actresses from Rio de Janeiro (city)
Brazilian people of Italian descent
Brazilian film actresses
Brazilian stage actresses
Brazilian television actresses